The Copa Catalunya Femenina is a knockout competition organised by the Catalan Football Federation for women's football clubs in the Catalonia autonomous community of Spain. Since its establishment in 2005 it has been dominated by FC Barcelona and RCD Espanyol, with eight and five titles respectively.

Finals

See also
 Copa Catalunya (male counterpart)
 Copa Euskal Herria (equivalent competition in the Basque region)

References

Catalan football competitions
Football cup competitions in Spain
Women's football competitions in Spain